Kafr Zabad   is a village in Lebanon. It is also the site of two ancient Roman antae temples.

History

The village is very old; probably was founded during early Roman centuries. It is located at nearly 986 meters of altitude. It is famous because of its Roman temples.

George F. Taylor classed the temples in a group of Temples of the Beqaa Valley. The temples had almost been completely destroyed when Taylor visited the site. He noted only foundations and some parts of the cella walls and pediment of the upper temple had survived. Remains of architraves, carved stones and door frames littered the hill.

The lower temple had only one section of upright door frame, again with blocks of pediment, architrave and cornice lying scattered about the landscape of the Anti-Lebanon. The figure is barely recognisable and had been mostly destroyed with only the lower half remaining distinguishable: indeed to the northeast of the lower temple there it is a rock-cut relief of Venus, called "Bint El Malik" or the king's daughter by the local people. 

There it is also a Roman sanctuary probably dedicated to the god Mercury; the area also has ancient quarries and shaft tombs from the Roman period. 

In 1838, Eli Smith noted  Kefr Zebad  as a Druse and Christian village in the Baalbek area.

Geography 
The town is situated 58 km (36 mi) to the east of the Lebanese capital Beirut. It is possible to drive a car from the village to Beirut in  75 minutes, depending on traffic and speed.

Climate 
Kafr Zabad is located in the East of Lebanon. Located in the Beqaa Valley it is normal to have a dry weather. It rarely rains in Kafr Zabad in the summer rather very warm. Winters, however, are rather cold, and are also characterized by heavy snows. The Litani river (which is one of the most polluted rivers in the middle east) flows just around the outskirts of the town.

See also

 Temples of the Beqaa Valley
 Temnin el-Foka

References

Bibliography

External links
Kfar Zabad, Localiban

Populated places in Zahlé District
Archaeological sites in Lebanon
Ancient Roman temples
Roman sites in Lebanon
Tourist attractions in Lebanon